Ian Oxenford (born 3 September 1932) is an Australian cricketer. He played in twelve first-class matches for Queensland between 1958 and 1960.

See also
 List of Queensland first-class cricketers

References

External links
 

1932 births
Living people
Australian cricketers
Queensland cricketers
Cricketers from Brisbane